Creekside is a historic home located near Morganton, Burke County, North Carolina.  It was built in 1836, and is a two-story, five bay, brick mansion with a gable roof in the Greek Revival style.  It features a tetrastyle pedimented portico covers with heavy stuccoed brick Doric order columns. The interior features Federal style decorative elements. It was built by Thomas George Walton, great nephew of George Walton, a signer of the Declaration of Independence.

It was listed on the National Register of Historic Places in 1972.

References

Houses on the National Register of Historic Places in North Carolina
Federal architecture in North Carolina
Greek Revival houses in North Carolina
Houses completed in 1836
Houses in Burke County, North Carolina
National Register of Historic Places in Burke County, North Carolina
1836 establishments in North Carolina